The 201 Dome Mosque is a large mosque under construction in South Pathalia village, Bangladesh.

Construction of the mosque began in 2013 on 15 bighas of land on the east bank of the Jhenai River in South Pathalia village, Nagda Simla Union, Gopalpur Upazila, Tangail District, Bangladesh. It is being built by the Heroic Freedom Fighter Mohammad Rafiqul Islam Welfare Trust. The estimated cost of construction is BDT 100 crore ($12.3 million).

The mosque is expected to have a capacity of about 3,000 devotees.

The mosque is a square building. The central dome is surrounded by 200 smaller  domes. It is expected to be the highest minaret in Bangladesh. The western wall of the mosque will be inscribed with the entire Qur'an.

In addition to the main worship space, the mosque complex will house an orphanage, an elder care home, and a hospital with free treatment. The complex will feature a helipad in order to host dignitaries.

Gallery

See also 
 Sixty Dome Mosque

References

External links 

 

Mosques in Bangladesh